This is a List of famines in China, part of the series of lists of disasters in China. Between 108 BC and 1911 AD, there were no fewer than 1,828 recorded famines in China, or once nearly every year in one province or another. The famines varied in severity.

Famines in China

Responding to famines 

In China famines have been an ongoing problem for thousands of years. From the Shang dynasty (16th-11th century BC) until the founding of modern China, chroniclers have regularly described recurring disasters. There have always been times and places where rains have failed, especially in the northwest of China, and this has led to famine.

It was the task of the Emperor of China to provide assistance, as necessary, to famine areas and transport foods from other areas and to distribute them. The reputation of an emperor depended on how he succeeded. National famines occurred even when the drought areas were too large, especially when simultaneously larger areas of flooded rivers were over their banks and thus additionally crop failures occurred, or when the central government did not have sufficient reserves. If an emperor could not prevent a famine, he lost prestige and legitimacy. It was said that he had lost the Mandate of Heaven.

Qing China built an elaborate system designed to minimize famine deaths. The system was destroyed in the Taiping Rebellion of the 1850s.

See also 
List of disasters in China by death toll
History of famines in the Far East
List of famines

References

Further reading
 Bohr, Paul Richard. Famine in China and the missionary: Timothy Richard as relief administrator and advocate of national reform, 1876–1884 (Brill, 2020).
 Edgerton-Tarpley, Kathryn Jean. "From 'Nourish the People' to 'Sacrifice for the Nation': Changing Responses to Disaster in Late Imperial and Modern China." Journal of Asian Studies (2014): 447-469. online 
 Edgerton-Tarpley, Kathryn, and Cormac O'gr. Tears from iron: cultural responses to famine in nineteenth-century China (U of California Press, 2008).
 Li, Lillian M. Fighting famine in North China: state, market, and environmental decline, 1690s-1990s (Stanford UP, 2007).
 Maohong, Bao. "Environmental history in China." Environment and History (2004): 475-499. online

 Shiue, Carol H. "The political economy of famine relief in China, 1740–1820." Journal of Interdisciplinary History 36.1 (2005): 33-55. online
 Shiue, Carol H. "Local granaries and central government disaster relief: moral hazard and intergovernmental finance in eighteenth-and nineteenth-century China." Journal of Economic History (2004): 100-124. online
 Will, Pierre-Etienne, and R. Bin Wong. Nourish the people: The state civilian granary system in China, 1650–1850 (University of Michigan Press, 2020).

famines